Charles Cutler (born Charles Olsen; February 2, 1884 – December 25, 1952), sometimes spelled Charles Cuttler, was a professional wrestler and three time American Heavyweight Champion and one time World Heavyweight Champion .

Championships and accomplishments
 Professional wrestling
American Heavyweight Championship (3 times)
 American Mixed Style Championship (1 time)
 World Heavyweight Wrestling Championship (1 time)

References

External links

1884 births
1952 deaths
American male professional wrestlers
Professional wrestlers from Michigan